The 2012 Australian Open women's doubles was a tournament that took place during the 2012 Australian Open at Melbourne Park in Melbourne, Australia.

Gisela Dulko and Flavia Pennetta were the defending champions, but lost to Svetlana Kuznetsova and Vera Zvonareva in the third round. The unseeded Russian pair went on to defeat Sara Errani and Roberta Vinci, 5–7, 6–4, 6–3, for the title.

Seeds

Draw

Finals

Top half

Section 1

Section 2

Bottom half

Section 3

Section 4

References

External links
 2012 Australian Open – Women's draws and results at the International Tennis Federation

Women's Doubles
Australian Open (tennis) by year – Women's doubles
2012 in Australian women's sport